Altscheid is a municipality in the district of Bitburg-Prüm, in Rhineland-Palatinate, western Germany.

Geography
The municipal area is partly in the German-Luxembourg Nature Park.

Birkendell and part of Neumühle belong to Altscheid.

The neighboring communities are Weidingen and Wißmannsdorf.

References

Bitburg-Prüm